Nationality words link to articles with information on the nation's poetry or literature (for instance, Irish or France).

Events
 After August 16 – Sir William Davenant becomes poet laureate of England on the death of Ben Jonson (on the death of Davenant in 1668, he is succeeded by John Dryden)

Works published
 Sir William Alexander, Recreations with the Muses, contains Four Monarchicke Tragedies, Doomesday, A Paraenesis to Prince Henry (all previously published), and Jonathan: An heroicke poem
 Arthur Johnston, Scottish poet writing in Latin
 Psalmorum Davidis paraphrasis poetica et canticorum evangelicorum, translation of the Psalms
 Deliciae poetarum Scotorum huius aevi illustrium, edited anthology
 Thomas Jordan, Poeticall Varieties; or, Varietie of Fancies including "Coronemus nos Rosis antequam marcescant" ("Let us drink and be merry")
 Ralph Knevet, Funerall Elegies, elegies on Lady Katherine Paston
 Shackerley Marmion, The Legend of Cupid and Psyche
 Nathaniel Whiting, Le hore di recreatione; or, The Pleasant Historie of Albino and Bellama

Births
Death years link to the corresponding "[year] in poetry" article:
 August 16 – Emilie Juliane of Schwarzburg-Rudolstadt (died 1706), German countess and hymn writer

Deaths
Birth years link to the corresponding "[year] in poetry" article:
 Before July – Henry Adamson (born 1581), Scottish poet and historian
 February 3 – Gervase Markham (born 1568), English poet and writer
 May 29 – Jiří Třanovský, also known as "Juraj Tranovský" or "Georgius Tranoscius" (Latinized) (born 1592), Czech and Slovak hymnwriter, sometimes called the father of Slovak hymnody and the "Luther of the Slavs"
 July 26 – Philippe Habert (born 1604), French poet
 August 10 – Edward King (born 1612), Irish poet writing in Latin in England; a friend of John Milton who writes "Lycidas" in his memory (contributed to Justa Edouardo King Naufrago, 1638); drowned in shipwreck in the Irish Sea
 c. August 16 – Ben Jonson (born 1572), English playwright and poet
 Johannes Narssius (born 1580), Dutch-born New Latin poet and physician

See also

 17th century in literature
 17th century in poetry
 Poetry

Notes

17th-century poetry
Poetry